Hopper Gristmill Site is located near 156 Ramapo Valley Road in Mahwah, Bergen County, New Jersey, United States. The gristmill was built in 1764 and was added to the National Register of Historic Places on March 3, 1983.

See also
National Register of Historic Places listings in Bergen County, New Jersey

References

 Hopper Gristmill Site - Historical Marker Database with photo of the marker

Industrial buildings and structures on the National Register of Historic Places in New Jersey
Geography of Bergen County, New Jersey
Mahwah, New Jersey
National Register of Historic Places in Bergen County, New Jersey
New Jersey Register of Historic Places
1764 establishments in New Jersey